Sanghao Cave is a Paleolithic site, located on the Pothohar Plateau of Pakistan that was excavated by Ahmad Hasan Dani.

Site

The cave is often referred as Parkho-darra.

Discovery

Evidence of human activity in the Middle Palaeolithic has been reported from Sanghao Cave. The cave was excavated by Ahmad Hasan Dani in 1963. Chipped stone, bones, were found during the excavation. Other items included scrapers, quartz tools, blades, flakes, etc.

See also
 Bhimbetka rock shelters
 Lithic analysis

References

Further reading
 
 
 
 

History of Pakistan
History of India
Mardan District
Archaeological sites in Khyber Pakhtunkhwa